Justinus Cardinal  Darmojuwono (2 November 1914 – 3 February 1994) was an Indonesian Cardinal of the Roman Catholic Church. He served as Archbishop of Semarang from 1963 to 1981 and was elevated to the rank of cardinal in 1967, becoming the first Indonesian to be a cardinal.

Early life
Justinus Darmojuwono was born in Klewonan, Godean, Yogyakarta. Son of Surodikira and Ngatinah, his early life as an ordinary villager son was a happy and proud time for him. He and his family worked together to fulfill their daily needs. He was a Muslim, but converted to Catholicism in 1932 following his brother's conversion. Actually, Justinus Darmojuwono did not get permission to be a priest from his father. But, because of his strong self-determination to become a priest, his father allowed him to enter the seminary on 30 September 1935. After he graduated from the minor seminary of Mertoyudan, Magelang, he continued to the major seminary of St. Paul, Yogyakarta. He was ordained priest by Mgr. Soegijapranata in Kotabaru, Yogyakarta, in 1947. He also studied at the Pontifical Gregorian University in Rome.

As priest
After ordination, he was first appointed to serve at Kidul Loji Church, Yogyakarta, for 35 days. Then he was sent to Ganjuran Church to take care of seminary students, because the minor seminary was destroyed and the Vicar Apostolic of Semarang sent the seminarians to the Ganjuran church. In the middle of 1950, Darmojuwono was appointed to serve at St. Mary of Assumption Church, Klaten, and also to serve as a military curate. At the time, the military commander was Suharto, later the President of Indonesia.

From Klaten he moved to Surakarta in 1952. After a few months in Surakarta he was ordered to study missiology at Pontifical Gregorian University, Rome. After he returned from Rome, he became a curate in Purbayan, Surakarta, and also served as a military chaplain. Then he was sent to establish a new church in 1961 and became its pastor. The church was later named Maria Regina Purbawardayan Church.

In 1962, he was appointed to serve as a parish priest at the Semarang Cathedral and also as Vicar General of the Archdiocese of Semarang. Then Archbishop of Semarang Mgr. Soegijapranata died on a trip to attend the Second Vatican Council.
Darmojuwono was appointed Archbishop of Semarang by Pope Paul VI on 10 December 1963, and consecrated archbishop by the Apostolic Nuncio Archbishop Ottavio De Liva on 6 April 1964.

As archbishop
He was received by President Sukarno at Merdeka Palace immediately after being ordained archbishop of Semarang in 1964. The President often called him "Romo Agung" (Great Clergyman), but he preferred to be called "Romo" (Clergyman).

As an archbishop, he attended the third and fourth sessions of Second Vatican Council. When he attended the third Council session, Indonesia was in grave danger. The 30 September Movement tragedy happened in 1965, and Darmojuwono was ordered to go home as soon as possible. He followed the news about the G30S tragedy from abroad, and the news was devastating. Many people were killed at the time.

As cardinal

He was appointed Cardinal-Priest of Ss. Nome di Gesù e Maria in Via Lata by Pope Paul VI on 26 June 1967, as a member of the College of Cardinals. The ordination was done in the Sistine Chapel. He was appointed cardinal together with Karol Wojtyla from Poland, who later became Pope John Paul II. He said that he was appointed cardinal because he was a Head of Supreme Council of Indonesian Bishops (MAWI), and the Head of MAWI is the primus inter pares.
He attended the Papal Conclave in August 1978 which appointed Pope John Paul I, and the Papal Conclave in October 1978 which appointed Pope John Paul II. He had been a member of Pontifical Council for Dialogue with Non-Believers.
When Pope Paul VI visited Manila in 1970, he lobbied widely, together with Bishop Labayen from the Philippines and Cardinal Stephen Kim Sou-hwan from South Korea, for the establishment of Federation of Asian Bishops' Conferences. Darmojuwono as a member of the Standing Committee of that conference, and so attended FABC meetings outside the country. Almost all Catholics in Asia at the time knew him from his lobbying in many countries.
He resigned from his post as Archbishop of Semarang in 1981 because of health reasons, and settled at the Santa Maria Fatima Church in Banyumanik, Semarang.

Death
He became a consecrator for 13 bishops in Indonesia and was a Cardinal for 29 years. Mgr. Justinus Darmojuwono died on 3 February 1994 in Semarang, Indonesia. He was buried at Kerkhoof Muntilan cemetery, beside other prominent Catholics like Van Lith, SJ, and RD. Sandjaja.

See also

Cardinal electors in Papal conclaves, August and October 1978

References

External links

1914 births
1994 deaths
Javanese people
Indonesian cardinals
20th-century Roman Catholic archbishops in Indonesia
Participants in the Second Vatican Council
Cardinals created by Pope Paul VI
Converts to Roman Catholicism from Islam
Indonesian former Muslims
Pontifical Gregorian University alumni
People from Sleman Regency